Fubuki may refer to:

Fictional characters 
Fubuki Shirou, a character in Inazuma Eleven
Fubuki Kakuyoku, a character in Naruto the Movie
Fubuki Sakuragasaki, the main character in the anime Arcade Gamer Fubuki
Fubuki Satō, a character in YuYu Hakusho
Fubuki Tenjouin or Atticus Rhodes, a character in Yu-Gi-Oh! GX
Shirakami Fubuki, a virtual Youtuber affiliated with Hololive Production

People 
 Fubuki Kuno (born 1989), Japanese footballer
 Fubuki Koshiji (1924–1980), Japanese actress and singer
 Fubuki Takane (born 1965), Japanese actress
 Jun Fubuki (born 1952), Japanese actress

Ships
 Fubuki-class destroyer, a class of destroyers of the Imperial Japanese Navy
 Japanese destroyer Fubuki (1927), a Fubuki-class destroyer of the Imperial Japanese Navy in World War II

Other uses
 Japanese for blizzard
 Fubuki (cipher), a candidate in the eSTREAM cryptography project
 The ending song of the television anime series Kantai Collection

Japanese feminine given names
Japanese-language surnames